Noceda is a river in León Province, in the northwestern part of the autonomous community of Castile and León, in northwestern Spain.

Rivers of León, Spain